Shepard State Park is a state park in the U.S. state of Mississippi. It is located off U.S. Highway 90 on the south side of Gautier. The city has had responsibility for the park's management since 2013.

Activities and amenities
The park features boating and fishing on the Singing River, 30 primitive sites for tent camping, 28 developed campsites, group tent camping,  of nature trails, playing fields, picnic area, playground, and an 18-hole disc golf course, Alligator Alley.

References

External links
Shepard State Park Mississippi Department of Wildlife, Fisheries, and Parks

State parks of Mississippi
Protected areas of Jackson County, Mississippi